Moreton Frewen (8 May 1853 – 2 September 1924) was and entrepreneur, an Anglo-Irish writer on monetary reform, who served briefly as a Member of Parliament (MP).

Early life
Frewen was born the 8 May 1853 in England.  He was the fifth son of Thomas Frewen (1811–1870), MP for South Leicestershire, and the third son of Helen Louisa (née Homan) Frewen (1821-1901).

He was educated at Eton College and Trinity College, Cambridge, where he gained his BA in 1877.

Career
Frewen was a charming adventurer from an English landed gentry family in Leicestershire and Sussex. He was known as a fine shot, often invited to shoot at Sandringham by the Prince of Wales, the future Edward VII; a good horseman who taught Lillie Langtry to ride; and a keen fisherman. He gambled most of his inheritance on a two-horse race, declaring he would go to America if he lost - which he did.

He journeyed to Wyoming during the cattle boom in the 1870s and 1880s.  He founded an enormous ranch at Kaycee in Wyoming, where he built the first two storey building in the state. During his stay from 1879-1886 and, later, his many visits in America, he shook hands with every president from Ulysses Grant to Theodore Roosevelt in the White House. He met and married an American heiress, Clara Jerome in New York. They returned together to the Wyoming ranch but then Clara miscarried a child and she never returned to the euphemistically named Castle Frewen. Her husband, together with his brother Richard, soldiered on until the catastrophically cold winter of 1885-1886 wiped out his herd: the cattle died of thirst, being unable to break the ice in the rivers and lakes.

Moreton's brother-in-law Lord Randolph Churchill, Winston's father, recommended him to the Nizam of Hyderabad, then the world's richest man, to sort out the corruption and theft in his court. Moreton spent two years there from 1887-1889 and succeeded in re-organising the Nizam's finances whilst routing out the miscreants. He left with the Nizam's thanks, having made many friends, including Salar Jung II, the Prime Minister of Hyderabad State, for whom he found a wife in Constantinople.

Returning to the United Kingdom, where he owned homes in London and Innishannon in County Cork (then part of United Kingdom of Great Britain and Ireland), Frewen served as Vice President of the Imperial Federation League. He wrote on tariff reform and other economic matters and was an advocate of bimetallism.

He became involved in Irish affairs through inheriting the 3,000 acres Innishannon Estate from his brother Richard, who was drowned at sea; and through his friendships with Lord Dunraven and Timothy Healy (MP).

Member of Parliament
He was elected unopposed at the December 1910 general election as an All-for-Ireland League MP for North East Cork, taking his seat in the House of Commons of the United Kingdom of Great Britain and Ireland.  He resigned on 5 July 1911 because his seat was needed for Healy and because of his reactionary public statements: his opposition to the Parliament Bill to remove the legislative veto of the House of Lords was proving a political liability. Later he signed the British Covenant in support of Ulster, while continuing to engage in political intrigues.

Personal life
In 1881, he married Clarita "Clara" Jerome (1851–1935), daughter of the New York City financier Leonard Jerome, and sister to Lord Randolph Churchill's wife Jennie.  He was a brother-in-law not only to the Churchills (parents of Winston) but also to Sir John Leslie of Glaslough.  His niece Ruby, the daughter of his younger brother Stephen, was the second wife of Sir Edward Carson.  

Together, Moreton and Clara were the parents of two surviving sons and a daughter (another daughter, Jasmine, died at birth), including:

 Hugh Moreton Frewen (1883–1967)
 Captain Oswald Moreton Frewen (1887–1958), a member of the Royal Navy.
 Clare Consuelo Frewen (1885–1970), the sculptress and writer.

Frewen died 2 September 1924 in England.

Works
The economic crisis, 1888
Melton Mowbray, and other memories, 1924

In popular culture
 Frewen figures prominently in the novel Mortal Ruin by John Malcolm.

See also
List of United Kingdom MPs with the shortest service

References

External links

Andrea Downing: Moreton Frewen (Mortal Ruin) with photos
 
Moreton Frewen Papers at University of Wyoming - American Heritage center
Digital Collection of Moreton Frewen Papers- American Heritage Center

1853 births
1924 deaths
People educated at Eton College
British economists
Members of the Parliament of the United Kingdom for County Cork constituencies (1801–1922)
UK MPs 1910–1918
All-for-Ireland League MPs
Politicians from County Cork
Remittance men